Gretna School is a historic school at 722 Church Street in Gretna, Florida, United States. On June 10, 2008, it was added to the U.S. National Register of Historic Places.

References

Schools in Gadsden County, Florida
Defunct schools in Florida
School buildings on the National Register of Historic Places in Florida
National Register of Historic Places in Gadsden County, Florida
Historically segregated African-American schools in Florida